Elisabeth Auguste of Sulzbach (Elisabeth Auguste; 17 January 1721 – 17 August 1794) was the eldest granddaughter of the Elector of the Palatinate Charles III Philip, and by her marriage to Elector Palatine Charles IV Theodore, Electress Palatine and later Electress of Bavaria.

Biography 

Elisabeth Auguste's parents were Joseph Charles of Sulzbach (1694–1729) and Elisabeth Auguste of Neuburg (1693–1728), the latter the daughter of Elector Charles III Philip. On 17 January 1742, she married her cousin Charles Theodore of Sulzbach, who became Elector of the Palatinate in 1742 and Elector of Bavaria in 1777.

The marriage was arranged to avoid a potential inheritance dispute within the different family branches. While Charles Theodore was described as learned and interested in the enlightenment, Elisabeth Augusta was described as vivacious, pleasure loving, uneducated and shallow. During the first half of their marriage, she is said to have dominated her spouse, and during the Seven Years' War, she exerted influence over the Palatine foreign policy. In 1760, however, it was reported that Charles Theodor was beginning to free himself from her dominance.

Elisabeth Auguste bore only one child, a son (christened Francis Louis Joseph) on 28 June 1762, twenty years after their marriage; but the long-awaited son and heir to the Palatinate died just one day after his birth.  The couple thereafter largely lived apart, each one taking lovers of their own. Divorce was never contemplated. Due to her not having a child and unable to have another legitimate child due to the discontinued marital sexual relations, she had no power base at court after she had lost her personal influence over her spouse. In 1764, Charles Theodor had an official mistress, the dancer Françoise Despres-Verneuil, who was succeeded by Josefa Seiffert in 1766, which was a humiliation for Elisabeth Auguste.

Elisabeth Auguste moved to her own residence of Schloss von Oggersheim, where she lived permanently with her own court from 1768, only making formal visits to the court of her spouse in winter: after 1781, she discontinued also with these visits. She did not like the Bavarian court, which she regarded to be too spartan for her taste. She was quite popular in the Palatinate, especially since Charles Theodor moved to Bavaria in 1777.

At the end of 1793, in the face of advancing French troops, Elisabeth Auguste fled to Weinheim, where she died in 1794.  Her husband subsequently married Maria Leopoldine of Austria-Este.

Honours 
 : First Sovereign of the Order of Saint Elizabeth (feminine order)

Issue

Count Palatine Franz Ludwig Joseph of Sulzbach (28 June 1762 – 29 June 1762) died in infancy.

Ancestry

Bibliography

 Lebenslust und Frömmigkeit, Kurfürst Carl Theodor zwischen Barock und Aufklärung, Handbuch  und Ausstellungskatalog 
 Karl Kreuter, Kurfüstin Elisabeth Auguste von Pfalz-Bayern 1727 - 1794, Oggersheim 1919

Electresses of the Palatinate
1721 births
1794 deaths
House of Wittelsbach
Countesses Palatine of Sulzbach
Electresses of Bavaria
Electoral Princesses of Bavaria
Duchesses of Jülich
Duchesses of Berg
Electoral Princesses of the Palatinate
Burials at St. Michael's Church, Munich